Unseeded Miloslav Mečíř won the singles title at the ABN World Tennis Tournament, after a 6–1, 6–2 win in the final against Jakob Hlasek, who was also unseeded.

Seeds

Draw

Finals

Upper half

Lower half

References

External links
 ITF tournament edition details

1985 ABN World Tennis Tournament